2779 km is a rural locality (a railway station) in Kukharevskoye Rural Settlement of Isilkulsky District, Russia. The population was 8 as of 2010.

Geography 
The village is located 15 km east from Isilkul.

Streets 
 Putevaya

References 

Rural localities in Omsk Oblast